James Leslie Bain Allsop   (born April 1953) is Chief Justice of the Federal Court of Australia, in office since 1 March 2013. He was previously President of the New South Wales Court of Appeal, where he presided from 2 June 2008 to 28 February 2013.

Education
Allsop attended Sydney Grammar School and completed year 12 in 1970. Allsop then graduated from the University of Sydney with a Bachelor of Arts in 1974 and a Bachelor of Laws in 1980. He won the University Medal in law.

Career
Allsop was admitted to the New South Wales Bar in 1981, and was appointed Senior Counsel in 1994. He was appointed Queen's Counsel in Western Australia in 1998.

From 2001 to 2008, Allsop was a Justice of the Federal Court of Australia. He has also served as an additional Justice of the Supreme Court of the Australian Capital Territory (2003–08). Allsop was appointed the President of the New South Wales Court of Appeal on 2 June 2008.

On 20 November 2012, Commonwealth Attorney-General Nicola Roxon announced Allsop would be appointed Chief Justice of the Federal Court of Australia. In January 2022, he presided over the application for judicial review regarding the visa status of Novak Djokovic on the Full Bench of the Federal Court of Australia.  In March 2022 he presided over the Court's ruling that the Commonwealth Minister for the Environment has no duty of care to protect children from the impacts of climate change when considering fossil fuel projects, a ruling that was characterised as undoing "20 years of climate litigation progress in Australia" and demonstrating the "yawning crevasse between the facts in the real world and Australian "environmental" law".

Allsop is also an adjunct professor at the University of Sydney, where he specialises in international admiralty and maritime law.

Honours
Allsop was appointed an Officer of the Order of Australia (AO) in 2013 for distinguished service to the judiciary and the law, as a judge, through reforms to equity and access, and through contributions to the administration of maritime law and legal education. He was promoted to Companion of the Order of Australia (AC) in the 2023 Australia Day Honours for "eminent service to the judiciary and to the law, to organisational and technological reform, to legal education, and to insolvency law".

See also
List of Judges of the Federal Court of Australia

References

Chief Justices of the Federal Court of Australia
Judges of the Federal Court of Australia
Judges of the Supreme Court of New South Wales
Presidents of the NSW Court of Appeal
Judges of the Supreme Court of the Australian Capital Territory
Australian King's Counsel
People educated at Sydney Grammar School
University of Sydney alumni
Academic staff of the University of Sydney
Companions of the Order of Australia
Officers of the Order of Australia
Living people
1953 births